The 2021 Zadar Open was a professional tennis tournament played on clay courts. It was the first edition of the tournament which was part of the 2021 ATP Challenger Tour. It took place in Zadar, Croatia between 22 and 28 March 2021.

Singles main-draw entrants

Seeds

 1 Rankings are as of 15 March 2021.

Other entrants
The following players received wildcards into the singles main draw:
  Frane Ninčević
  Matija Pecotić
  Mili Poljičak

The following player received entry into the singles main draw as an alternate:
  Harry Bourchier

The following players received entry from the qualifying draw:
  Marco Bortolotti
  Nerman Fatić
  Uladzimir Ignatik
  Nikolás Sánchez Izquierdo

The following players received entry as lucky losers:
  Ivan Nedelko
  Vladyslav Orlov

Champions

Singles

 Nikola Milojević def.  Dimitar Kuzmanov 2–6, 6–2, 7–6(7–5).

Doubles

 Blaž Kavčič /  Blaž Rola def.  Lukáš Klein /  Alex Molčan 2–6, 6–2, [10–3].

References

2021 ATP Challenger Tour
2021 in Croatian sport
March 2021 sports events in Europe